Potassium dicyanoaurate is an inorganic compound with formula K[Au(CN)2]. It is a colorless to white solid that is soluble in water and slightly soluble in alcohol. The salt itself is often not isolated, but solutions of the dicyanoaurate ion ([Au(CN)2]−) are generated on a large scale in the extraction of gold from its ores.

Production
In mining of gold from dilute sources, gold is selectively extracted by dissolution in aqueous solutions of cyanide, provided by dissolving sodium cyanide, potassium cyanide and/or calcium cyanide. The reaction for the dissolution of gold, the "Elsner Equation", is:
4 Au + 8 KCN + O2  +  2 H2O → 4 K[Au(CN)2] + 4 KOH
In this process, oxygen is the oxidant.

It can also be produced by reaction of gold(I) salts with excess potassium cyanide.
AuCl + 2 KCN  → K[Au(CN)2]  +  KCl

Structure

Potassium dicyanoaurate is a salt.  The dicyanoaurate anion is linear according to X-ray crystallography.  On the basis of infrared spectroscopy, the dicyanoaurate anion adopts a very similar structure in sodium dicyanoaurate (NaAu(CN)2).

Uses
Dicyanoaurate is the soluble species that is the focus of gold cyanidation, the hydrometallurgical process for winning gold from dilute ores. In fact, sodium cyanide, not the potassium salt, is more widely used in commercial processes.

Aside from its major use as an intermediate in the extraction of gold, potassium dicyanoaurate is often used in gold plating applications.

Related compounds
The compound containing gold(III) cyanide is also known: potassium tetracyanoaurate(III), K[Au(CN)4]. Its use is less common.

The potassium ion can be replaced with quaternary ammonium cations as in tetrabutylammonium dicyanoaurate.

Safety
The ingestion of a gram quantities of potassium dicyanoaurate has led to death.

References

Cyanides
Aurates
Gold(I) compounds
Potassium compounds
Cyanometallates